Notes from a Defeatist is a collection of short journalistic comics by Joe Sacco. It was published in 2003.

References

Further reading
 Sacco, Joe (2003). Notes from a Defeatist, Fantagraphics Books. 

Comics by Joe Sacco
Non-fiction graphic novels
Fantagraphics titles